Gerbera ( or ) L. is a genus of plants in the Asteraceae (Compositae) family. The first scientific description of a Gerbera was made by J. D. Hooker in Curtis's Botanical Magazine in 1889 when he described Gerbera jamesonii, a South African species also known as Transvaal daisy or Barberton daisy. Gerbera is also commonly known as the African daisy.

Etymology 
The genus was named in honour of German botanist and medical doctor Traugott Gerber (1710 — 1743) who travelled extensively in Russia and was a friend of Carl Linnaeus.

Description 

Gerbera species are tufted, caulescent, perennial herbs, often with woolly crown, up to 80 cm high. Leaves are all in rosette, elliptical with entire or toothed margin or lobed, petiolate or with a petaloid base, pinnately veined, often leathery and felted beneath. Single to several flowering stems from each rosette bear bracteate or ebracteate, simple, one-headed inflorescence-capitulum. Capitula are radiate, with several rows of bracts.  Ray florets are female, 2-lipped, the outer lip is large and strap-shaped, inner lip consists of two small, thread-like lobes of white, pink or red, rarely yellow colour. Disc florets are fertile, five-lobed and irregularly 2-lipped with curled petals.

Species 
Formerly included numerous species once considered members of Gerbera are now regarded as more suited to other genera: Chaptalia, Leibnitzia, Mairia, Perdicium, Trichocline, and Oreoseris.

In accordance with International Plant Names Index genus Gerbera includes 22 accepted species:

Section Gerbera 
 Gerbera crocea Kuntze — Dialstee
 Gerbera grandis J.C.Manning & Simka
 Gerbera linnaei Cass. — Varingblom
 Gerbera ovata J.C.Manning & Simka
 Gerbera serrata Druce
 Gerbera tomentosa DC.
 Gerbera wrightii Harv.

Section Lasiopus (Cass.) Sch.Bip.
 Gerbera ambigua Sch.Bip.
 Gerbera aurantiaca Sch.Bip. — Hilton daisy
 Gerbera galpinii Klatt — Galpin's gerbera
 Gerbera jamesonii Bolus — Barberton daisy, Gerbera daisy, Transvaal daisy
 Gerbera sylvicola Johnson, N.R.Crouch & T.J.Edwards
 Gerbera viridifolia (DC.) Sch.Bip. — Pink gerbera

Section Pseudoseris (Baill.) Jeffr.
 Gerbera bojeri Sch.Bip. — Bojer's gerbera
 Gerbera diversifolia Humbert
 Gerbera elliptica Humbert
 Gerbera emirnensis Baker
 Gerbera hypochaeridoides Baker
 Gerbera leandrii Humbert
 Gerbera perrieri Humbert
 Gerbera petasitifolia Humbert

Section Parva H.V.Hansen
 Gerbera parva N.E.Br.

Distribution 
Gerbera is native to tropical regions of Africa. It was introduced into countries of Latin America and Southeast Asia.

Uses 
Gerbera is very popular and widely used as a decorative garden plant or as cut flowers. The domesticated cultivars are mostly a result of a cross between Gerbera jamesonii and another South African species Gerbera viridifolia. The cross is known as Gerbera × hybrida. Thousands of cultivars exist. They vary greatly in shape and size. Colours include white, yellow, orange, red, and pink. The centre of the flower is sometimes black. Often the same flower can have petals of several different colours. The flower-heads (capitula) can be as small as 7 cm (Gerbera 'mini Harley') in diameter or up to 12 cm (Gerbera ‘Golden Serena’).

Gerbera is also important commercially. It is the fifth most used cut flower in the world (after rose, carnation, chrysanthemum, and tulip). It is also used as a model organism in studying flower formation.

Gerbera contains naturally occurring coumarin derivatives. It is attractive to bees, butterflies, and birds, but resistant to deer. Small ones are called gerbrinis.

References

Sources
 Hansen, Hans V. A taxonomic revision of the genus Gerbera (Compositae, Mutisieae) sections Gerbera, Parva, Piloselloides (in Africa), and Lasiopus (Opera botanica. No. 78; 1985), .
 Nesom, G .L. 2004. Response to "The Gerbera complex (Asteraceae, Mutisieae): to split or not to split" by Liliana Katinas. Sida 21:941–942.
 Bremer K. 1994: Asteraceae: cladistics and classification. Timber Press: Portland, Oregon.

External links 

 Gerbera.org—official website of the Gerbera Association—established in Barberton, South Africa
 Traugott-Gerber-Museum, Germany (German)

Asteraceae genera
Garden plants
Mutisieae